I'm Back is the 57th studio album by American musician James Brown. The album was released on November 17, 1998, by Mercury Records.

Track listing

References

James Brown albums
1998 albums
Albums produced by James Brown
Mercury Records albums